Chabhal Kalan (also known as Jhabal Kalan) is a town in the Tarn Taran district of Punjab, India and is located  away from Amritsar city.

Description

The neighboring villages are Chabhal Khurd, Thathi, Sohal, Sarai Amanat Khan Nurdin, Lalu Ghumman, Mannan, Panjwar and 20 km west of Amritsar Sahib. Chabhal Kalan is a very ancient village and is centuries old. It was one of the many earliest villages of Punjab. The village was founded by Dhillon Jatts. Chabhal Kalan is located in Tarn Taran district, Punjab.

The place is known for being the birthplace of Maharaja Baghel Singh, Mai Bhago Ji, and Bhai Langah and many more. The village was once an important place of the Mughal empire,  contributing the third portion of the overall 9 Lac revenue collected by its main divisional pargana - Patti, Punjab. The village was also the center Jagir gifted by Akbar to Bibi Bhani as a present on her wedding.

The village is Jatt and the main religion is Sikhism.

History

The Chabhal Brothers

Chaudhary Langah a Dhillon Jatt of Chabhal Kalan was a well known chieftain who had 84 villages under him in the Amritsar area during the late 16th Century. He was one of the three Chaudharys of Majha of Patti Parganah during the rule of Akbar, a liberal and secular Mughal ruler from 1556-1605. The family was a Hindu Jatt but Bhai Langaha's father took the name Abu Al Khair and converted to Islam. The family also started worshiping Sakhi Sarwar a Mystical Pir. Chaudhary Langah became so ill once that even his prayer to Sakhi Sarwar could not cure him from his pain. So, he met a Sikh who told him to pray to God Almighty and to House of Guru Nanak. Langah got better and converted to Sikhism, his Brother Bhai Pero Shah also became a Sikh. The whole family became a Sikh at that time. Guru Arjan Dev Ji (1563–1606) was the fifth Sikh Guru prophet.

In 1588, both brothers went to Amritsar, then known as Guru Ka Chak, Holy Sikh City and also helped in the construction of the Harmandir Sahib. They preached Sikhism in their territories and soon Chabhal Kalan became a Sikh preaching center during the time of the Fifth Sikh prophet in the 1580s.

Their descendants were Mai Bhag Kaur, the granddaughter of Chaudhary Pero Shah daughter of Bhai Mallo Shah and was a famous Sikh warrior during the time of Guru Gobind Singh Ji (1666–1708) Tenth Sikh Prophet. She led a group (Jatha) of 40 Sikhs from her Village and from neighboring villages to wage a war against the Muslim Empire of the Mughals in 1705.

Jathedar Baba Baghel Singh was married into this family and made this village his home. He was a Sikh Warrior and a Misl Ruler who in 1783 invaded and raided Mughal Delhi.

The House of the Jhabalia Sikh Brothers Langah, Pero Shah, still stands but is in ruins as it is about 500 years old, with old Nanakshahi Bricks.

The famous Jhabal Brothers, Amar Singh Jhabalia, Sarmukh Singh Jhabalia and Jaswant Singh Jhabalia who sacrificed a lot for Gurduwara reforms and freedom struggle belonged to this village. Dr. Parkash Kaur, daughter-in-law off S. Amar Singh Chabhal became the first woman to be a Minister in erstwhile East Punjab after the partition of India and worked for the welfare of Punjab. S. Sarmukh Singh Jhabalia was the founder President of Shiromani Akali Dal.

Education

 Sri Guru Harkrishan Sr. Sec. Public School, Chabhal
 Baba Budha College,Bir Sahib
 Red Rose Public School, Chabhal
 St. Francis High School, Chabhal
 SRI GURU TEG BAHADUR PUBLIC HIGH SCHOOL, CHABHAL
 BABA BUDHA PUBLIC SENIOR SECONDARY SCHOOL, BIR SAHIB THATHA
 JASWANT RAI SOOD DAV PUBLIC SCHOOL, CHABHAL
 GYAN JYOTI PUBLIC SCHOOL, VILLAGE CHABHAL

Hospitals

 Baba Budha Ji Charitable Hospital, Thatha
 Gupta Hospital, Amritsar Road, Chabhal
 Surta Singh Hospital, Adda Chabhal
 C.H.C. Govt. Hospital, Chabhal Kalan
 Surjit Hospital, Chabhal
 Mahla Hospital, Adda Chabhal

Famous events
The land/villages around the village, Chabhal, were gifted by Akbar to Bibi Bhani on her wedding. This place was the center of the Jagir. And when Baba Budha Sahib ji was asked to take care of the Jagir, they reside at a nearby place in the beed(jungle) and spent a major part of his life in the place. A Gurdwara has been built in his remembrance on the place. Some people migrated near the Gurdwara forming a village, now known as Thatta.

The marriage of daughter of Guru Hargobind Sahib Ji (1595–1644) Sixth Sikh Guru, Bibi Viro (b.1615)was arranged in Jhabal Kalan and she was married to Bhai Sadhu son of Bhai Dharma of Village Malla. A Gurdwara stands known as Bibi Viro Anand Karaj Asthan where the marriage ceremony took place. She was the mother of five sons.

Location 
The village is located on the intersection of Amritsar to Khemkaran Road and Amritsar to Atari Road near Patti, Punjab. By Road is about 22 km from Amritsar and 16 km from Tarn Taran Sahib. The village is quite near to the countries border shared with Pakistan.

Notable people 
 Mai Bhago (1670-1720}. Sikh female warrior
 Baghel Singh (c. 1730 – c. 1802). general and leader of the misl
 Karam Singh (1884–1930). historian

References

External links
 http://www.historicalgurudwaras.com/India/Punjab/TaranTaaran/GurudwaraShriBibiVeeroJi/gallery.php
 http://www.historicalgurudwaras.com/India/Punjab/TaranTaaran/GurudwaraShriMaiBhagoJi/gallery.php
 http://www.thesikhencyclopedia.com/punjab/jhabal-kalan
 http://www.sikh-history.com/sikhhist/gurus/bhailangah.html
 https://web.archive.org/web/20120426080305/https://export.writer.zoho.com/public/adhillon/0401-JoSS-Village-Jhubal-and-Jhubalia-Clan2/fullpage

Villages in Amritsar district